Expose, exposé, or exposed may refer to:

News sources
 Exposé (journalism), a form of investigative journalism
 The Exposé, a British conspiracist website

Film and TV

Film
 Exposé (film), a 1976 thriller film
 Exposed (1932 film), a 1932 film starring Barbara Kent
 Exposed (1938 film), a 1938 film starring Glenda Farrell
 Exposed (1947 film), a 1947 film starring Adele Mara
 Exposed (1983 film), a 1983 film starring Nastassja Kinski
 Exposed (2003 film), a 2003 American independent comedy film
 Exposed (2011 film), a 2011 film starring Jodi Lyn O'Keefe
 Exposed (2016 film), a 2016 film starring Keanu Reeves

Television
 "Exposé" (Lost), a 2007 episode of Lost
 Exposé: America's Investigative Reports, a PBS news/documentary series
 eXposed, the pilot of the American television show The Gifted
 Exposed (U.S. game show), a 2007 American dating game show that aired on MTV
 Exposed (Canadian TV program), a 2004 Canadian music television program that aired on MuchMusic
 "Exposed" (Heroes), a 2009 episode of Heroes
 "Exposed" (UFO) (UFO), a 1970 episode of UFO

Music
 Exposé (group), a 1980s and 1990s vocal group that reformed in 2006

Albums
 Exposé (album), 1992 album by Exposé
 Expose (Shizuka Kudo album), 1994
 Exposed (Boom Boom Satellites album), 2007
 Exposed (Chanté Moore album)
 Exposed (CoCo Lee album)
 Exposed (Kristinia DeBarge album)
 Exposed (Mike Oldfield album), 1979
 Exposed (Vince Neil album), 1993
 Exposed (Kiss), a 1987 video by Kiss
 Exposed (Mike Oldfield video), a 1979 live concert video by Mike Oldfield

Song
 "Expose" (song), a 2013 song by Japanese boy band KAT-TUN

Other
 Exposé, now Mission Control, a window management tool for macOS
 Exposed (heights), situation with a significant risk of falling from heights e.g. when climbing
 EXPOSE, astrobiology equipment on the International Space Station
 The Exposed (novel), a novel in the Animorphs series, by K.A. Applegate

See also
 Exeposé, the University of Exeter student newspaper
 expo.se, website for Swedish magazine Expo
 Exposure (disambiguation)
 Exposition (disambiguation)
 Xposé, Irish television programme
 The Xposé, 2014 Hindi film
 Xposed, album by G.E.M.
 X-Posed (R.O.C. album)

tl:Lantad